Jianjiapo Township is an rural township in Sangzhi County, Zhangjiajie, Hunan Province, China.

Administrative division
The township is divided into 13 villages, the following areas: Xipaohe Village, Leijiapo Village, Wangjiata Village, Xiaoqichi Village, Jianjiapo Village, Nanmenpo Village, Lumaoping Village, Yaochang Village, Lijia Village, Yanluojie Village, Yanyuan Village, Lao Village, and Zhaojiata Village (洗泡河村、雷家坡村、王家塔村、宵淇池村、蹇家坡村、南门坡村、芦茅坪村、药厂村、李家村、燕落界村、茶园村民委员会、老村、赵家塔村).

References

External links

Former towns and townships of Sangzhi County